Krishnagar Assembly constituency was an assembly constituency in Nadia district in the Indian state of West Bengal.

Members of Legislative Assembly

Results

1951-1962
Kashi Kanta Maitra of PSP won the Krishnagar seat in 1962. Jagannath Majumdar of Congress won in 1957. In independent India's first election in 1951 Bejoy Lal Chattopadhyay of Congress won the Krishnagar seat.

References

Former assembly constituencies of West Bengal
Constituencies established in 1951
Constituencies disestablished in 1962